Richard "Ricky" Sharp (born 26 January 1956) was a Scottish professional footballer who is best known for his time with Dunfermline Athletic and Kilmarnock.

Football career
Sharp joined Rangers on 6 April 1974 from Bargeddie Amateurs. He made one appearance for the club during a Scottish League Cup match against Hibernian, on 10 August 1974. Sharp was substituted (replaced by Jim Denny), with Rangers losing 0–3 at half time and he never played for the club again.

He moved on to Morton shortly afterwards. On 17 January 1976, Sharp left Morton and joined Kilmarnock before moving on to St Mirren eighteen months later in September 1977. Sharp had subsequent spells with Dunfermline Athletic and East Stirlingshire respectively.

Later career
Sharp retired from professional football in 1982 and joined Strathclyde Police.

Personal life
Sharp has one older brother (Andrew) and one younger brother, former Everton and Scotland striker Graeme.

References

External links
Richard Sharp at fitbastats.com

1956 births
Footballers from Glasgow
Scottish footballers
Association football forwards
Rangers F.C. players
Kilmarnock F.C. players
Greenock Morton F.C. players
St Mirren F.C. players
Scottish Football League players
Living people
East Stirlingshire F.C. players
Dunfermline Athletic F.C. players